James Alfred Van Allen (September 7, 1914August 9, 2006) was an American space scientist at the University of Iowa. He was instrumental in establishing the field of magnetospheric research in space.

The Van Allen radiation belts were named after him, following his discovery using Geiger–Müller tube instruments on the 1958 satellites (Explorer 1, Explorer 3, and Pioneer 3) during the International Geophysical Year. Van Allen led the scientific community in putting scientific research instruments on space satellites.

Early years and education

Van Allen was born on September 7, 1914, on a small farm near Mount Pleasant, Iowa. As a child, he was fascinated by mechanical and electrical devices and was an avid reader of Popular Mechanics and Popular Science magazines. He once horrified his mother by constructing a Tesla coil that produced foot-long sparks and caused his hair to stand on end.

A fellowship allowed him to continue studying nuclear physics at the Carnegie Institution in Washington, D.C., where he also became immersed in research in geomagnetism, cosmic rays, auroral physics and the physics of Earth's upper atmosphere.

World War II
In August 1939, Van Allen joined the Department of Terrestrial Magnetism (DTM) of the Carnegie Institution in Washington, D.C. as a Carnegie Research Fellow. In the summer of 1940, he joined DTM's national defense efforts with his appointment to a staff position in Section T with the National Defense Research Committee (NDRC) in Washington, D.C., where he worked on the development of photoelectric and radio proximity fuzes, which are detonators that increase the effectiveness of anti-aircraft fire. Another NDRC project later became the atomic bomb Manhattan Project in 1941. With the outbreak of World War II, the proximity fuze work was transferred to the newly created Applied Physics Laboratory (APL) of Johns Hopkins University in April 1942. He worked on improving the ruggedness of vacuum tubes subject to the vibration from a gun battery. The work at APL resulted in a new generation of radio-proximity fuses for anti-aircraft defense of ships and for shore bombardment.

Van Allen was commissioned as a U.S. Navy lieutenant in November 1942 and served for 16 months on a succession of South Pacific Fleet destroyers, instructing gunnery officers and conducting tests on his artillery fuses. He was an assistant staff gunnery officer on the battleship USS Washington when the ship successfully defended itself against a Japanese kamikaze attack during the Battle of the Philippine Sea, (June 19–20, 1944). For his actions at the Pacific, Van Allen was awarded four battle stars. He was promoted to lieutenant commander in 1946. "My service as a naval officer was, far and away, the most broadening experience of my lifetime," he wrote in a 1990 autobiographical essay.

1946–1954 Aerobee and Rockoon
Discharged from the Navy in 1946, Van Allen returned to civilian research at APL. He organized and directed a team at Johns Hopkins University to conduct high-altitude experiments, using V-2 rockets captured from the Germans at the end of World War II. Van Allen decided a small sounding rocket was needed for upper atmosphere research. The Aerojet WAC Corporal and the Bumblebee missile were developed under a US Navy program. He drew specifications for the Aerobee sounding rocket and headed the committee that convinced the U.S. government to produce it. The first instrument-carrying Aerobee was the A-5, launched on March 5, 1948, from White Sands, New Mexico, carrying instruments for cosmic radiation research, reaching an altitude of 117.5 km.

Van Allen was elected chairman of the V-2 Upper Atmosphere Panel on December 29, 1947. The panel was renamed Upper Atmosphere Rocket Research Panel on March 18, 1948; then Rocket and Satellite Research Panel on April 29, 1948. The panel suspended operations on May 19, 1960, and had a reunion on February 2, 1968.

Cmdr. Lee Lewis, Cmdr. G. Halvorson, S.F. Singer, and James A. Van Allen developed the idea for the Rockoon on March 1, 1949, during the Aerobee rocket firing cruise on the research vessel U.S.S. Norton Sound.

On April 5, 1950, Van Allen left the Applied Physics Laboratory, to accept a John Simon Guggenheim Memorial Foundation research fellowship at the Brookhaven National Laboratory. The following year (1951) Van Allen accepted the position as head of the physics department at the University of Iowa. Before long, he was enlisting students in his efforts to discover the secrets of the wild blue yonder and inventing ways to carry instruments higher into the atmosphere than ever before. By 1952, Van Allen was the first to devise a balloon-rocket combination that lifted rockets on balloons high above most of the Earth's atmosphere before firing them even higher. The rockets were ignited after the balloons reached an altitude of 16 kilometers.

As Time magazine later reported, "Van Allen’s ‘Rockoons’ could not be fired in Iowa for fear that the spent rockets would strike an Iowan or his house." So Van Allen convinced the U.S. Coast Guard to let him fire his Rockoons from the icebreaker Eastwind that was bound for Greenland. "The first balloon rose properly to 70,000 ft., but the rocket hanging under it did not fire. The second Rockoon behaved in the same maddening way. On the theory that extreme cold at high altitude might have stopped the clockwork supposed to ignite the rockets, Van Allen heated cans of orange juice, smuggled them into the third Rockoon’s gondola, and wrapped the whole business in insulation. The rocket fired."

In 1953, the Rockoons and their science payloads fired off Newfoundland detected the first hint of radiation belts surrounding Earth. The low-cost Rockoon technique was later used by the Office of Naval Research and The University of Iowa research groups in 1953–55 and 1957, from ships at sea between Boston and Thule, Greenland.

In 1954, in a private discussion about the Redstone project with Ernst Stuhlinger, Wernher von Braun expressed his belief that they should have a "real, honest-to-goodness scientist" involved in their little unofficial satellite project. Stuhlinger followed up with a visit to Van Allen at his home in Princeton, New Jersey, where Van Allen was on sabbatical leave from Iowa to work on stellarator design. Van Allen later recounted, "Stuhlinger’s 1954 message was simple and eloquent. By virtue of ballistic missile developments at Army Ballistic Missile Agency (ABMA), it was realistic to expect that within a year or two a small scientific satellite could be propelled into a durable orbit around the earth (Project Orbiter).... I expressed a keen interest in performing a worldwide survey of the cosmic-ray intensity above the atmosphere."

International Geophysical Year 1957–58

In 1955, the U.S. announced Project Vanguard as part of the US contribution to the International Geophysical Year. Vanguard planned to launch an artificial satellite into an orbit around the Earth. It was to be run by the US Navy and developed from sounding rockets, which had the advantage of being primarily used for non-military scientific experiments.

A symposium on "The Scientific Uses of Earth Satellites" was held on January 26 and 27, 1956 at the University of Michigan under sponsorship of the Upper Atmosphere Rocket Research Panel, chaired by Dr. Van Allen.  33 scientific proposals were presented for inclusion in the IGY satellites. Van Allen's presentation highlighted the use of satellites for continuing cosmic-ray investigations. At this same time his Iowa Group began preparations for scientific research instruments to be carried by 'Rockoons' and Vanguard for the International Geophysical Year. Through "preparedness and good fortune," as he later wrote, those scientific instruments were available for incorporation in the 1958 Explorer and Pioneer IGY launches.

 July 1, 1957: The International Geophysical Year begins. IGY is carried out by the International Council of Scientific Unions, over an 18-month period selected to match the period of maximum solar activity (e.g. sun spots). Lloyd Berkner, one of the scientists at the April 5, 1950, Silver Spring, Maryland meeting in Van Allen's home, serves as president of the ICSU from 1957 to 1959.
 September 26, 1957: Thirty-six Rockoons (balloon-launched rockets) were launched from Navy icebreaker U.S.S. Glacier in Atlantic, Pacific, and Antarctic areas ranging from 75° N. to 72° S. latitude, as part of the U.S. International Geophysical Year scientific program headed by Van Allen and Lawrence J. Cahill of The University of Iowa. These were the first known upper atmosphere rocket soundings in the Antarctic area. Launched from IGY Rockoon Launch Site 2, Atlantic Ocean; Latitude: 0.83° N, Longitude: 0.99° W.
 October 4, 1957: The Soviet Union (USSR) successfully launches Sputnik 1, the world's first artificial satellite, as part of their participation in the IGY.

 January 31, 1958: The first American satellite, Explorer 1, was launched into Earth's orbit on a Juno I four-stage booster rocket from Cape Canaveral, Florida. Aboard Explorer 1 were a micrometeorite detector and a cosmic ray experiment designed by Van Allen and his graduate students, with the satellite deployment of the sensor package supervised by Ernst Stuhlinger, who also had an expert cosmic ray background. Data from Explorer 1 and Explorer 3 (launched March 26, 1958) were used by the Iowa group to make "the first space-age scientific discovery": "the existence of a doughnut-shaped region of charged particle radiation trapped by the Earth’s magnetic field".
 July 29, 1958: United States Congress passed the National Aeronautics and Space Act (commonly called the "Space Act"), which created the National Aeronautics and Space Administration (NASA) as of October 1, 1958, from the National Advisory Committee for Aeronautics (NACA) and other government agencies.
 December 6, 1958: Pioneer 3, the third intended U.S. International Geophysical Year probe under the direction of NASA with the Army acting as executive agent, was launched from the Atlantic Missile Range by a Juno II rocket. The primary objective of the flight, to place the 12.95 pound (5.87 kg) scientific payload in the vicinity of the moon, failed. Pioneer III did reach an altitude of 63,000 miles (101 000 km), providing Van Allen additional data that led to discovery of a second radiation belt. Trapped radiation starts at an altitude of several hundred miles from Earth and extends for several thousand miles into space. The Van Allen radiation belts are named after Van Allen, their discoverer.

Pioneer of space science and exploration
The May 4, 1959, issue of Time magazine credited James Van Allen as the man most responsible for giving the U.S. "a big lead in scientific achievement." They called Van Allen "a key figure in the cold war’s competition for prestige. .... Today he can tip back his head and look at the sky. Beyond its outermost blue are the world-encompassing belts of fierce radiation that bear his name. No human name has ever been given to a more majestic feature of the planet Earth."

James Van Allen, his colleagues, associates and students at The University of Iowa continued to fly scientific instruments on sounding rockets, Earth satellites (Explorer 52 / Hawkeye 1), and interplanetary spacecraft including the first missions (Pioneer program, Mariner program, Voyager program, Galileo spacecraft) to the planets Venus, Mars, Jupiter, Saturn, Uranus, and Neptune. Their discoveries contributed important segments to the world's knowledge of energetic particles, plasmas and radio waves throughout the solar system.

Van Allen was the principal investigator for scientific investigations on 24 Earth satellites and planetary missions.

Professor emeritus
Van Allen stepped down as the head of the Dept. of Physics & Astronomy in 1985, but continued working at the University of Iowa as the Carver Professor of Physics, Emeritus. On October 9, 2004, the University of Iowa and the UI Alumni Association hosted a celebration to honor Van Allen and his many accomplishments, and in recognition of his 90th birthday. Activities included an invited lecture series, a public lecture followed by a cake and punch reception, and an evening banquet with many of his former colleagues and students in attendance. In August 2005, an elementary school bearing his name opened in North Liberty, Iowa.  There is also a Van Allen elementary school in Escalon, CA.

In 2009, Van Allen's boyhood home in Mt. Pleasant, once maintained as a museum, was slated to be demolished. The new owner, Lee Pennebaker, chose not to demolish the home. It was donated to the Henry County Heritage Trust, which plans to move the house next to the old Saunders School which will be the home of the Henry County museum.

Personal life and death
Van Allen's  wife of 61 years was Abigail Fithian Halsey II of Cincinnati (1922–2008). They met at the Johns Hopkins University Applied Physics Laboratory (JHU/APL) during World War II. They were married October 13, 1945, in Southampton, Long Island. Their five children are Cynthia, Margot, Sarah, Thomas, and Peter.

On August 9, 2006, James Van Allen died at University Hospitals in Iowa City from heart failure.

Professor Van Allen and his wife Abigail are buried in Southampton, New York, where Mrs. Van Allen was born and the couple were married.

Legacy and honors

 Elected to the United States National Academy of Sciences (1959)
 Time magazine Man of the Year in 1960
 Elliott Cresson Medal in 1961
 Elected to the American Philosophical Society (1961)
 Iowa Award in 1961
 Elected to the American Academy of Arts and Sciences (1964)
 Distinguished Fellow, Iowa Academy of Science in 1975
 Gold Medal of the Royal Astronomical Society in 1978
 National Medal of Science in 1987
 Golden Plate Award of the American Academy of Achievement in 1988
 Crafoord Prize in 1989
 Vannevar Bush Award in 1991
 NASA's Lifetime Achievement Award in 1994
 National Air and Space Museum Trophy in 2006
 Van Allen Probes (NASA mission, renamed from the Radiation Belt Storm Probes) in 2012

Van Allen Probes mission

On November 9, 2012, NASA renamed the Radiation Belt Storm Probes (RBSP), a mission to study Earth's Van Allen radiation belts, as the Van Allen Probes mission in honor of the late James A. Van Allen, U.S. space pioneer and longtime distinguished professor of physics in the University of Iowa College of Liberal Arts and Sciences.
The Applied Physics Laboratory, where Dr. Van Allen worked for a decade, is responsible for the overall implementation and instrument management for RBSP. The primary mission is scheduled to last 2 years, with expendables expected to last for 4 years.

NASA BARREL mission

Eighty years after the Second Byrd Expedition, the Balloon Array for RBSP Relativistic Electron Losses (BARREL), a NASA mission began to study Earth's Van Allen radiation belts at the Antarctic (South Pole) managed by Dartmouth College. BARREL launched 20 balloons from Antarctica during each of two balloon campaigns in January–February 2013 and December 2013 – February 2014. This scientific data will complement the Van Allen Probes data over the two-year mission.

See also
 George H. Ludwig
 Stamatios Krimigis (Tom Krimigis)
 Explorer program
 Sputnik program
 Sputnik crisis
 Pioneer 10, Pioneer 11, Pioneer H

Notes

References

 Brief biography
 Brief NASA biography
 Foerstner, Abigail; James van Allen: The first eight billion miles, 2007.
 Krimigis, Stamatios M.; Planetary Magnetospheres: Van Allen Radiation Belts of the Solar System Planets
 Ludwig, George; The First Explorer Satellites
 Ludwig, George; James Van Allen, From High School to the Beginning of the Space Era: A Biographical Sketch
 Organization of the James A. Van Allen Papers, 1938–1990
 McIlwain, Carl; Discovery of the Van Allen Radiation Belts
 NASA, NASA Radiation Belt Storm Probes Mission
 NASA; Silver Anniversary of Pioneer 10
 Nature; Obituary: James A. Van Allen (1914–2006) in Nature, September 14, 2006. 
 Dvorak, Todd. (August 9, 2006) U.S. Space Pioneer James Van Allen Dies at 91. Space.com
 Tabor, Robert; Artist Robert Tabor Depicts the Discovery of Van Allen Radiation Belts
 Thomsen, Michelle; Jupiter's Radiation Belt and Pioneer 10 and 11
 University of Iowa; Van Allen Day – October 9, 2004, University of Iowa Foundation and UI Department of Astronomy & Physics
 University of Iowa; U.S. Space Pioneer, UI Professor James A. Van Allen Dies
 Van Allen, James A. "Space Science, Space Technology and the Space Station"; Scientific American, January 1986, page 22.
 Van Allen, James; What Is A Space Scientist? An Autobiographical Example
 
 Van Allen Elementary School in North Liberty, IA; Van Allen elementary homepage
 Van Allen Elementary School in Mt. Pleasant, IA; Van Allen elementary homepage
 Wade, Mark; Timeline
 Wolverton, Mark; The Depths of Space: The Story of the Pioneer Planetary Probes . 2004

External links

 Explorer's Legacy, University of Iowa site including the downloadable data sets from the digitized Explorer I data tapes.
 James Van Allen Papers at the University of Iowa Special Collections & University Archives intro to the collection , and finding aid. 
 James Van Allen Papers digital collection  – Iowa Digital Library

1914 births
2006 deaths
American nuclear physicists
American people of Dutch descent
Iowa Wesleyan University alumni
Members of the United States National Academy of Sciences
National Medal of Science laureates
People from Mount Pleasant, Iowa
Recipients of the Gold Medal of the Royal Astronomical Society
University of Iowa alumni
University of Iowa faculty
Vannevar Bush Award recipients
20th-century American physicists
Members of the Royal Swedish Academy of Sciences
Time Person of the Year
Members of the American Philosophical Society